Félix Manuel Cano (born 26 April 1966 in Barcelona) is a former Spanish baseball pitcher and first baseman with CB Viladecans and the Spanish national baseball team. He played for Spain at the 1992 Summer Olympics.

References

1966 births
Living people
Sportspeople from Barcelona
Olympic baseball players of Spain
Spanish baseball players
Baseball players at the 1992 Summer Olympics
Baseball first basemen
Baseball pitchers